Asser Ashraf Fouad Yassin (born February 25, 1981) is an Egyptian actor, writer, and film producer. He has been awarded Best Actor for several of his works. Yassin began his career on the stage of the American University in Cairo spotted by Director Khairy Beshara to play his first role on TV in Qalb Habiba in 2006, followed by the blockbuster The Yacoubian Building in 2007. His first major film release was Zay El Naharda (2008) where he was praised for his supporting role, playing the character of a drug addict. In the same year, Yassin got his big break and played a leading role in the movie "El Waad" lit. The Promise,  facing the legendary actor and superstar Mahmoud Yassin. In 2010, Yassin played the leading role in a Daoud Abdel Sayed movie Messages from the Sea, for which he was awarded Best Actor at the Carthage Film Festival, and Malmö Arab Film Festival. He was also awarded Best Actor for his latest release Aswar El Qamar (2015) by The Tetouan International Mediterranean Film Festival.

Early life

Yassin studied engineering at university, but friends asked him to stand in for an absent actor in a university play. As a result, he decided to take a theater course and participate in more productions.

After graduation, Yassin worked as an engineering teaching assistant at the American University in Cairo, before deciding to leave behind a developing career in engineering and academia to pursue his passion for acting.

Career

Yassin starred in the controversial and highly praised Beit Men Lahm (House of Flesh), based on the Arabic novel written by Yusuf Idris, directed by Rami A. Jabbar. Director Khairy Beshara gave him with a role in Qalb Habiba, the TV series that marked Soheir El-Bably’s comeback. Shortly after this his cinema debut followed with small roles in The Yacoubian Building and Halim.

Yassin appeared in supporting roles such as “Marei”, the villain brother to Ashraf Abdel Baqi in Aala Ganb Yasta and as Mo, the drug addict in Zay El Naharda. His first leading role was alongside Mahmoud Yassin in the action film Al Waad or The Promise, written by Waheed Hamid and directed by Mohamed Yassin.

Yassin's turning point was his leading role in Messages from the Sea, written and directed by Daoud Abdel Sayed.

Rags and Tatters (2013) was Yassin's first co-production experience when he worked with Film Clinic and Graal on a film about the unprivileged population of Egypt and their living situation after the Jan 25 revolution. Yassin also played the leading role which was mostly silent. The movie won Golden Antigone at the Montpellier Mediterranean Film Festival, and was nominated at the Abu Dhabi Film Festival, London Film Festival, Munich Film Festival and Thessaloniki Film Festival.

In 2015, Yassin won best actor at the Tetouan International Mediterranean Film Festival for his latest release, Aswar El Qamar.

In August 2021, Al-Arab announced an upcoming movie titled "Venous" (Arabic: فينوس) starring Yassin with the Egyptian actor and singer Ruby.

Personal life

Yassin is the eldest of 2 boys. Both his parents are engineers. Yassin is married with three children.

Filmography

|- every week on friday] || 2020 || imad
|

TV

Awards
Festival International Cinéma Méditerranéen Tétouan, 2015, Best Actor for his role in Aswar El Qamar
Malmö Arab Film Festival 2011, Best Actor for his role in Messages from the Sea
Carthage Film Festival 2010, Best Actor for his role in Messages from the Sea

References

External links
Asser Yassin Official Website

1981 births
Living people
Egyptian male film actors
The American University in Cairo alumni
Male actors from Cairo
Egyptian Muslims
Malmö Arab Film Festival winners